Shayar-e-Kashmir Mahjoor is a 1972 Bollywood biographical drama film directed by Prabhat Mukherjee. The film stars Balraj Sahni, Parikshat Sahni, Pran Kishore and Mohammad Yousuf Qureshi, famous Kathak dancer Geetanjali Desai.

The film is a biography of Kashmiri poet Ghulam Ahmed Mahjoor.

References

External links
 

1972 films
1970s Hindi-language films
1972 drama films